Salem is a locality and unincorporated place in the municipality of Clarington, Regional Municipality of Durham, in the Greater Toronto Area of Ontario, Canada.

References

Other map sources:

Communities in the Regional Municipality of Durham